The 2004 Liberty Bowl was a college football postseason bowl game played on December 31, 2004, in Memphis, Tennessee. The 46th edition of the Liberty Bowl was played between the Boise State Broncos and the Louisville Cardinals in front of 58,355 fans. With sponsorship from AutoZone, the game was officially the AutoZone Liberty Bowl. Louisville overcame a 10-point halftime deficit to win, 44–40.

Of non-Bowl Championship Series (BCS) bowl games following the 2004 regular season, this game featured the highest ranking teams, with Boise State 9th and Louisville 10th in the BCS rankings. Boise State played in place of the Mountain West Conference champions, the Utah Utes, who played in the Fiesta Bowl instead.

References

External links
 https://web.archive.org/web/20080513131538/http://uoflsports.cstv.com/sports/m-footbl/recaps/123104aaa.html

Liberty Bowl
Liberty Bowl
Boise State Broncos football bowl games
Louisville Cardinals football bowl games
December 2004 sports events in the United States
2004 in sports in Tennessee